A Case of Honor is a 1989 Australian/Philippine international co-production film directed by Eddie Romero.

Plot
1983: A group of American prisoners of war still held captive in Vietnam are informed they are to be taken to the Soviet Union for unknown reasons.  Perplexed and despondent, the group places their fate into the hands of Sgt Case, a devout Christian regarded by both his peers and the Vietnamese as a lunatic.  Case leads his friends into a Divine inspired escape with several surprises in store.

Cast
 Timothy Bottoms as Sgt. Joseph 'Hard' Case
 John Phillip Law as Capt. Roger L. Barnes
 Candy Raymond as Charlene 'Charlie' Delibes 
 Nick Nicholson as Pops
 Brent Venables as Grissom
 Jeff Griffith as Luke
 Steve Rogers as Bondano 
 Lucien Van as Lt. Col. Khe Trang
 Nigel Hogge as Col. Paul Gevanova

References

External links

1991 films
Philippine war drama films
Australian war drama films
Films about shot-down aviators
Films directed by Eddie Romero
Films set in 1983
Films shot in the Philippines
Vietnam War prisoner of war films
1990s English-language films
1980s English-language films